{{Infobox animanga/Other
| title           = Related media
| content         =
 List of Zatch Bell! video games
It was serialized in Shogakukan's shōnen manga magazine Weekly Shōnen Sunday between January 2001 and December 2007, with its chapters collected in thirty-three tankōbon volumes. The series follows the title character Zatch Bell, a mystical being called a Mamodo, who is partnered with a 14-year-old schoolboy Kiyo Takamine for a once-a-millennium tournament on Earth that determines the right to rule the Mamodo world as king. During their adventure, Zatch and Kiyo encounter and battle various Mamodo and their human partners, and meet allies who aid Zatch in his quest to become a "kind king." Zatch Bell! was later adapted into an anime television series produced by Toei Animation. The series aired for 150 episodes on Fuji TV from April 2003 to March 2006. In addition to an array of licensed merchandise, the franchise also spawned a series of video games and two animated theatrical films.

Viz Media licensed both the manga and anime series for English-language localization in North America in 2005; only twenty-five volumes of the manga were published until 2009. The anime series ran in the United States on Cartoon Network's Toonami and Miguzi programming blocks from 2005 to 2007 for seventy-seven episodes, and in Canada on YTV's Bionix programming block from 2005 to 2008; in all, 104 episodes were dubbed in English.

As of March 2017, the Zatch Bell! manga had over 23.8 million copies in circulation, including digital versions, making it one of the best-selling manga series. In 2003, the series won the 48th Shogakukan Manga Award for the shōnen category. The manga has received generally positive reviews from critics. It was praised for its unique characters, humor, and overall concept. The television adaptation has a more mixed reception, with criticism largely focused on the visuals, graphical violence, and voice acting, particularly for the English dub.

A sequel to the original manga, titled Konjiki no Gash!! 2, began digital distribution in March 2022.

Premise

Setting
The story takes place during the modern times in which mystical creatures with supernatural powers called Mamodo descend to Earth from the parallel Mamodo world. Every 1,000 years, one hundred Mamodo are sent to compete in a tournament for the kingship of their world. Each Mamodo carries a spell book that seals away their powers and requires a human companion to read aloud in order to cast them in the form of spells. Only one human is allowed to read from that Mamodo's book, whereupon he or she becomes its book owner and partner. 

Spells cast by the Mamodo produce a variety of effects. Along with direct attacks and defenses, there are also spells which trigger a Mamodo's special ability that can temporarily enhance its strength, give them a secondary form for fighting, create a barrier, render the enemy immobile, or empower an object they carry, although this is rare among Mamodo. Spells in each book are typically different for each Mamodo, but there are others that produce identical spells—an example of this is Zatch Bell and his twin brother, Zeno Bell, for their lightning-based powers. The human and their Mamodo usually start out with one spell, but may unlock more through experience and hard work. Additionally, the spell book responds to the user's strong emotions, so that a spell may be generated with greater energy and fervor. 

The Mamodo tournament involves eliminating opponents, which is achieved by burning their spell book. Once a spell book is burned, the Mamodo that possessed it loses all claim to the position as king and is immediately returned to the Mamodo world. The last Mamodo standing without their book destroyed becomes the Mamodo king for the next thousand years.

Synopsis
 Manga 
Kiyo Takamine is an intelligent 14-year-old junior high school student who lives with his mother in the fictional city of Mochinoki, Japan. One day, Kiyo's distant father, Professor Seitaro Takamine, discovers an unconscious child named Zatch Bell with a book at a forest in England, and sends him over to Kiyo in hopes of deciphering the book and determining Zatch's past which he has no memory of. Kiyo quickly discovers that Zatch is a Mamado and that the book causes Zatch to fire lightning from his mouth whenever a spell is read from it. Over time, Kiyo and Zatch come across other Mamodo, especially Brago and his partner French noblewoman Sherry Belmont, who explain the ongoing Mamodo tournament. Zatch and Kiyo also discover that some Mamodo do not wish to fight or do so for the wrong reasons; namely Kolulu, who was forced to fight due to the nature of her spells. Seeing this, Zatch pledges to become a kind king and stop the battle from ever happening again. Zatch and Kiyo also find friendlier Mamodo and build up alliances with them and their human partners; chief among them are Kanchomé with Italian movie star Parco Folgore, Tia with pop idol Megumi Oumi, Ponygon with German engineer Kafk Sunbeam (although the two do not find each other until later in the series), and Wonrei with teen Hong Konger girl Li-en.

Throughout the course of the tournament, Zatch, Kiyo, and their allies work together to combat several potent, ill-intentioned Mamodo. The first adversary they face is Zofis, who commands a cadre of reanimated Mamodo that were sealed in stone tablets during the previous tournament one thousand years ago. Zofis has also bent the will of his own partner, Sherry’s childhood friend Koko, into committing heinous acts such as burning down a whole village. Another enemy to emerge is Riou, a wrathful Mamodo who wields a semi-autonomous giant named Faudo that imperils the globe. Kiyo is nearly killed in a frantic mission to thwart Riou and avert Faudo. However, Riou is then overpowered by Zeno Bell, Zatch’s twin brother. Zeno is deeply envious of his sibling for procuring the sacred power of Bao from their father King Bell, and had removed Zatch's memories out of spite, but he soon comes around and apologizes upon seeing the error of his own ways. The last and perhaps most powerful Mamodo encountered is Clear Note, who sees no purpose in life and plans to eradicate the entire Mamodo race, including himself. Zatch and Kiyo call upon the spells of all the Mamodo they previously met to quash Clear Note and return him to the Mamodo world.

In the aftermath, Zatch manages to pull through the tournament unscathed, even though all of his allies fall and are brought back to the Mamodo world; this leaves him and Brago as the only remaining candidates on Earth. After Kiyo’s school graduation, the two ilk engage in a final showdown. Zatch ultimately defeats Brago, thereby ending the tournament as the victor. As Zatch departs for the Mamodo world, he rewards Kiyo one of two options for helping him become king: either receiving a wish and forgetting about Zatch, or get nothing but retain his memories of him. He chooses the second option. Three weeks after the tournament, a letter is sent from the Mamodo to their human counterparts, with Zatch's letter stating that all is well in the Mamodo world.

 Anime 
While the anime adaptation covers most of the premise, it observes changes in much of the manga's narrative. These include additional subplots and characters not featured in the original story. Certain scenes and key events are also altered or chronologically rearranged. For instance, Zatch and Kiyo first learn about Zeno from another Mamodo they encounter rather than directly from Tia as in the manga, although she and Megumi corroborate the sighting later on. Ponygon also appears earlier in the anime's timeline than in the manga's. Deviations in the plot are more pronounced during the climatic fight against Faudo in the third and final season. In particular, Kiyo's death does not occur, and Zeno never repents even when he returns to the Mamodo world. As a result of the changes, some Mamodo who lose out in the manga survive up to this point. The anime skips the events involving Clear Note and leaves the demise of most of Zatch's main allies and any remaining Mamodo unresolved. Instead, the series closes with an epilogue showing Zatch and Brago preparing to battle each other as the last two Mamodo standing, with the winner not revealed.

Production
Following the ending of his previous series in Shogakukan's Shōnen Sunday Super magazine, Raiku revisited old drafts he created for new ideas for his next series. One of his first ideas was a mercenary who uses a giant sword to defeat enemies. He played with this idea for three months before deciding to abandon it and go for another idea. His next idea involved a middle school student who finds an old toy and, with the help of a noble knight, combats evil. While pitching this idea with his agent, he was advised to use a cuter character as a fighter, and so the titular character Zatch was created. After Raiku worked on the idea for a few months, it was published. Raiku said that he intended to create a "passionate story about a heartwarming friendship," and that he used the concept as a central theme while adding the Mamodo, book, and spell concepts. He cited a western magical story he read as a source of inspiration for creating Zatch's red spell book. Zatch's lightning spells allude to the fact that Raiku's name means "lightning" in Japanese. He also mentioned that he created Folgore with the words "Invincible Italian Man" as a base. Raiku went on a research trip in England while writing volumes five and six, which both take place in said country.Zatch Bell! would be Raiku's last manga project published by Shogakukan. Once the series finished in December 2007, the company gave back his original artwork, a common practice for Japanese publishing companies. Of all the documents Raiku received, at least five drawings failed to turn up. Raiku accused Shogakukan of mishandling his artwork and, in 2007, filed a lawsuit seeking damages over the missing documents. He reached a settlement for  later that year.

The house in which Raiku authored the series was unique in that it doubled as a makeshift studio. Inside was a large collection of autographs from various manga artists displayed at the foyer, which was the first thing one would see upon entering the building. His studio also featured a high ceiling to prevent him from becoming claustrophobic, and he would spend an entire day there to meet a deadline. Raiku's collection of figurines would be displayed on the wall whenever he was present in the house. Raiku admitted that most of his work actually took place at a nearby restaurant where he also did most of his storyboarding. He added that there was less distraction, since he was just surrounded by people rather than games or even the Internet. Storyboarding for a regular chapter of Zatch Bell! took about two days for Raiku to make. When the editor approved the storyboard, Raiku summoned four assistants to the house for his project, and a fifth whenever necessary. Raiku sold the property in 2016.

Media
Manga
Written and illustrated by Makoto Raiku, Zatch Bell! was serialized in Shogakukan's Weekly Shōnen Sunday magazine from January 10, 2001, to December 26, 2007. The manga ran for a total of 323 chapters, collected in thirty-three tankōbon volumes, between May 18, 2001, and June 18, 2008.

The series was licensed for the English-language release by Viz Media, which also provided the alternate title. The first two volumes of the series were released on August 2, 2005. Viz Media discontinued the series after twenty-five volumes, with the last released on June 9, 2009. The manga was also published in English by Chuang Yi in Singapore.

In March 2011, Raiku released a one-shot chapter of Zatch Bell! to promote the repackaging of the manga in a new bunkoban format under Kodansha. Sixteen volumes were published between March 8, 2011, and June 7, 2012. In July 2018, a digital sixteen-volume kanzenban edition of Zatch Bell! was released through Birgdin Board Corp., Raiku's own publishing company. The re-releases feature newly-drawn cover art, color pages from the original Weekly Shōnen Sunday serialization, and a special bonus chapter in each volume called Zatch Café, which stars characters from that volume's cover. After successful sales and demand from fans, the kanzenban edition was released in physical format in 2019.

In February 2022, Raiku announced a sequel to the manga, titled , which began its digital publication on various digital book services on March 14 of the same year.

Anime

It began airing on Fuji Television on April 6, 2003, and ran for 50 episodes per season, concluding after three seasons on March 26, 2006. The episodes were collected and distributed by Pony Canyon into three DVD series, labeled as "levels", consisting of seventeen DVDs each, totaling fifty-one sets: the first level was released from November 19, 2003, to April 20, 2005; the second level was released from May 18, 2005, to June 21, 2006; the third level was released from July 5, 2006, to March 7, 2007.

ShoPro Entertainment (then VIZ LLC's sister company, later merged to form Viz Media) acquired the license to the anime series, under the title Zatch Bell! in 2004, and announced its home video release in August 2005. The English dubbed of the series (produced at Studiopolis) premiered in the United States on Cartoon Network's Saturday night programming block Toonami on March 5, 2005. The series was also broadcast on the network's daily programming block Miguzi starting on April 3, 2006. Seventy-seven episodes were broadcast on Cartoon Network until January 20, 2007. The series also premiered on YTV's programming block Bionix in Canada on September 9, 2005, and finished with the 104th and last English-dubbed episode on December 6, 2008. Thirteen DVDs, collecting the first fifty-two episodes, were released by Viz Media between November 8, 2005, and December 4, 2007. New Video Group released a DVD box set, Zatch Bell!: The Complete Seasons 1 & 2, on December 3, 2013, which included the first hundred episodes of the English dub. All 104 episodes of the English dub began streaming on Crunchyroll in 2015. In June 2017, Starz announced that it would be offering episodes of the series for its video on demand service starting on July 1, 2017.

 Films 
Toei Animation produced two animated films based on the TV series, both which serve as spin-offs. The first film, Zatch Bell!: 101st Devil, was released to Japanese theaters on August 7, 2004, and to DVD on December 15, 2004. Here, a vengeful Mamodo named Wiseman seeks to illicitly enter the tournament by stealing a coveted white spell book, then baiting Zatch into the Mamodo world as a means of displacing him from the battle for king. The film also explores Zatch's home world in finer detail and how a human partner is selected for each Mamodo, with Wiseman deemed incompatible for one. The second film, Zatch Bell! Movie 2: Attack of Mechavulcan, premiered in Japanese theaters on August 6, 2005, before coming out on DVD on January 2, 2006. This movie tells of a conceited Mamodo scientist, Dr. M2, from the future who invades Earth with an army of oversized robots resembling a toy that Kiyo made for Zatch in the main series.

Discotek Media licensed both films for distribution in North America. They were released on Blu-ray and DVD with the original Japanese audio and English subtitles on March 27 and May 21, 2018, respectively.

Video games

A number of video games have been created featuring characters of the Zatch Bell! series, with all but one being action or fighting games. Thus far, the majority of the games have only been published in Japan, but three have been imported and localized in North America. Zatch Bell! Electric Arena, initially released on December 12, 2003, for the Game Boy Advance, was the very first video game for the series. The second game titled Zatch Bell! Mamodo Battles, which debuted on March 25, 2004, for the PlayStation 2 and GameCube, became the first console game installment based on the series. Lastly, Zatch Bell! Mamodo Fury was released on December 2, 2004 for PlayStation 2 and is the only North American release for the GameCube. A fourth game titled Zatch Bell! Electric Arena 2 was intended to be released in North America, but the plan never materialized. A video card game based on the series' CCG is the only installment not featuring in-combat form of gameplay. Eighting, Banpresto, and Bandai oversaw the development and publication of the Zatch Bell! games; since the merging of Bandai and Namco in 2004, GameCube versions are published under Namco Bandai Games.

Other media

A toy line made by Mattel and a collectible card game, titled Zatch Bell!: The Card Battle, were released by Bandai in the United States and Japan.

Reception
MangaZatch Bell! won the Shogakukan Manga Award for best shōnen title of the year in 2003. It ranked 33rd of the top 100 manga series on TV Asahi's Manga Sōsenkyo poll in 2021, in which 150,000 people responded.

As of June 2008, the manga had over 22 million copies in circulation; as of March 2017, it had 23.8 million copies in circulation, including digital versions.

Jason Thompson from Anime News Network describes the series as "Zatch Bell! was one of hundreds of manga competing to be Number Two in the newly established genre of "heroes who fight using cute-but-violent monster/animal/pet companions." But Zatch is an extreme case because it's SO cute and SO violent, both at the same time, mixing squash-and-stretch body distortions, heta-uma ugliness, smiling faces and gushing blood". Mania.com's Jarred Pine's review of the first volume said that "The characters can look lopsided and out of proportions at times, with Kiyo experiencing Popeye arms on occasion. When the artwork gets more serious, it looks quite good, even though the added effect lines tend to make some panels feel a bit overdramatic, especially when Zatch is crying. The action work can feel quite explosive, with all the lighting bolts and flying icicles and all, which makes the Mamodo battle scenes a lot of fun. He added "The book really started off on the wrong foot with me with the introduction of Kiyo, one of the most irritating and arrogant lead characters in a shōnen manga. His attitude is not a result of any sort of disposition or a hard life, he’s just a know-it-all that looks down on others. Luckily, Zatch’s quirky and upbeat personality helps balance the scales and quickly goes to work on fixing Kiyo’s bad attitude".

Anime
In 2005, the series ranked 20th on Animages anime popularity poll, and 64th in the top 100 anime shows in a web poll conducted by TV Asahi. Although the show's English dub fared poorly in reviews, it became notable for its voiceover cast. Debi Derryberry, the voice for Zatch, was nominated twice for "Best Actress in a Comedy" at the American Anime Awards for her role as the titular character, while Jason Spisak placed fifth in the category "best English voice actor" in the SPJA Industry Award for his role as Kiyo. Dave Wittenberg was also nominated "Best Male Actor in a Comedy" for his portrayal of Parco Folgore. Philece Sampler was also accredited for her performance as the minor character Lori.Anime News Network's Zac Bertschy review of the anime adaptation described it as "...mind-numbingly over-the-top, so enthusiastically bizarre, that it's difficult to not get sucked into its strange little world" but criticized how it was like a "battle your way to the top while learning important lessons about teamwork and courage" anime. He commented how the "sheer exuberance and energy" saves the show from being a bland anime and how it would be the perfect show for kids. IGN's review of the series was mostly negative. IGN's Jason Van Horn criticized the animation, plot, and dubbed voice acting. IGN's JKB stated the books are more interesting than the animation. Common Sense Media describes the story as "isn't just about violence". They also say that there are always challenges, adversities, and questions of identity that the characters face especially Zatch and Kiyo. They compliment how the characters often think aloud when talking about their painful experiences or flashbacks. They applaud on how each of the characters problems in the series are not far off on what kids deal with today. They criticized how the battles uses visuals, languages, sound effects, and dramatic effects that often get drawn out and sometimes become hard to watch. Overall, they said with the graphic violence and the internal struggles that the different characters face throughout the series some parents may not find Zatch Bell! appropriate for their children under ten years old.

Other media
Bandai's The Card Battle'' game had sold over  units by May 2004.

Notes

References

External links

  
  
  
 
 
 

 
2001 manga
2003 anime television series debuts
Adventure anime and manga
Animated television series about children
Anime series based on manga
Comedy anime and manga
Discotek Media
Fantasy anime and manga
Fuji TV original programming
Manga adapted into films
Shogakukan manga
Shows on Toonami Jetstream
Shōnen manga
Toei Animation television
Toonami
Viz Media anime
Viz Media manga
Winners of the Shogakukan Manga Award for shōnen manga